Carlos César Ramos Custódio also known as Carlos César (born February 27, 1943 in Rio de Janeiro, Brazil) is a football manager who last worked.

Honours

Brazil
South American Under-17 Football Championship (2): 1997, 1999
FIFA U-17 World Cup (2): 1997, 1999
South American Youth Championship: 2001

References

Living people
1943 births
Brazilian football managers
Ettifaq FC managers
CR Flamengo managers
Brazil national under-20 football team managers
Brazil national under-17 football team managers
America Football Club (RJ) managers
Paysandu Sport Club managers
Duque de Caxias Futebol Clube managers
Bangu Atlético Clube managers
Footballers from Rio de Janeiro (city)
Brazilian footballers